Minden High School may refer to:

Minden High School (Minden, Louisiana)
Minden High School (Minden, Nebraska)